Nephrotoma crocata is a species of crane fly found in most of Europe and northern Russia. The subspecies N. c. luteata is found in southwest France, Portugal, Spain, Morocco, and Algeria.

Subspecies
N. c. crocata (Linnaeus, 1758)
N. c. luteata  (Meigen)

References

Tipulidae
Diptera of Europe
Diptera of Asia
Flies described in 1758
Taxa named by Carl Linnaeus